The Spindrift 22 is an American trailerable sailboat that was designed by Jim Taylor Yacht Designs and first built in 1982.

The Spindrift 22 is a development of the Spectrum 22, which was built by Spectrum Yachts in Florida.

Production
The design was built by Rebel Industries in the United States between 1982 and 1987, with 400 examples of the type completed.

Design

The Spindrift 22 is a small recreational keelboat, built predominantly of fiberglass, with wood trim. It has a masthead sloop rig, a raked stem, a nearly vertical transom, a transom-hung rudder controlled by a tiller and a fixed stub keel, with a centerboard. It displaces  and carries  of ballast.

The boat is normally fitted with a small  outboard motor for docking and maneuvering.

The design has sleeping accommodation for four people, with a double "V"-berth in the bow cabin and two straight settee berths in the main cabin. The galley is located on the starboard side just aft of the bow cabin. The galley is equipped with a sink. The head is located just aft of the bow cabin on the port side.

The design has a PHRF racing average handicap of 243 with a high of 234 and low of 252.

Operational history
In a 2010 review Steve Henkel wrote, "The concept was to build a safe, giving boat for a family of four, fun to sail and with some elbow room in the interior. Jim Taylor’s cozy and efficient layout on the original design is shown. When Spectrum left scene, Rebel Industries bought the molds and revised the interior (without consulting the designer) and continued building the boat under the Starwind and then the Spindrift name ... Best features: As with Jim Taylor's other designs, this one is wholesome and well-balanced, and fulfills her design concept nicely."

See also
List of sailing boat types

Similar sailboats
Alberg 22
Cape Dory 22
Capri 22
Catalina 22
CS 22
DS-22
Edel 665
Falmouth Cutter 22
Hunter 22
J/22
Marlow-Hunter 22
Marshall 22
Nonsuch 22
Pearson Electra
Pearson Ensign
Santana 22
Seaward 22
Starwind 223
Tanzer 22
US Yachts US 22

References

External links

Keelboats
1980s sailboat type designs
Sailing yachts
Trailer sailers
Sailboat type designs by Jim Taylor Yacht Designs
Sailboat types built by Spindrift One Designs